Czerwona is a river of Poland, which terminates in the Baltic Sea near Łasin Koszaliński.

Rivers of Poland
Rivers of West Pomeranian Voivodeship